Mark Burnett (born 12 November 1970) is a Guyanese cricketer. He played in one first-class and four List A matches for Guyana in 1992/93 and 1993/94.

See also
 List of Guyanese representative cricketers

References

External links
 

1970 births
Living people
Guyanese cricketers
Guyana cricketers